Iga may refer to:

Arts and entertainment 

 Ambush at Iga Pass, a 1958 Japanese film
 Iga no Kagemaru, Japanese manga series
 Iga, a set of characters from the Japanese novel The Kouga Ninja Scrolls

Biology 

 Iga (beetle), a genus of beetle in the family Carabidae
 IgA, Immunoglobulin A, an antibody
 Iga, or iga warta, Adnyamathanha name for Capparis mitchelii, the Australian native orange

Cuisine 

 Iga babi, Indonesian pork rib dish from Bali
 Iga penyet, Indonesian fried beef spare ribs dish from Java

People

Japan 

 , a Japanese physician who also practised in Hawaii
 , a Japanese video game producer, known for his involvement with the Castlevania series
  Japanese aerospace pioneer
 , a Japanese professional ice hockey player

Poland 

 Iga Baumgart-Witan, a Polish sprinter 
 Iga Cembrzyńska, a Polish actress
 Iga Wyrwał (also known as Eva or Eve), a Polish glamour model
 Iga Świątek, a Polish professional tennis player
 Jadwiga (diminutive "Iga"), a Polish female given name

Other 

 Ayesha Leti-I'iga, New Zealand rugby union player
 Christopher Iga, Ugandan politician

Places

Japan 

 Iga Province, an old province in the area that is today western Mie Prefecture, Japan
 Tenshō Iga War, the name of two historical invasions of the province
 Iga, Mie, a city in Mie Prefecture, Honshū island, Japan
 Iga Kokubun-ji, a buddhist temple
 Iga Kokuchō ruins, an archaeological site
 Iga Ueno Ninja Festa, annual five-week ninja-themed festival
 Iga ware, style of traditional Japanese pottery from Iga area
 IIga Ueno Castle, a fortification in the centre of town
 Iga-ryū (literally “the Iga School”), a school of ninjutsu in Japan

Elsewhere 

 Iga Idunganran, the official residence of the Oba (king) of Lagos, Nigeria
 Iga Vas, a village in Slovenia

Transport 

 Iga-Kōzu Station, a railway station on the Osaka line in the city of Iga, Mie prefecture, Japan
 Iga Railway Line, in the city of Iga, Mie prefecture, Japan
 Iga-Kambe Station, a railway station on the other end of Iga line
 Iga-Ueno Station, a railway terminus station on the Iga line
 Iga Station, a railway station on the Kashii Line in Kasuya, Fukuoka prefecture, Japan

Other uses 

 1854 Iga–Ueno earthquake, a deadly tremor in the Kansai region of Japan with the epicentre near Iga town
 8300 Iga (previously 1994 AO2), a main-belt asteroid
 Tanaka-Iga, a Japanese company producing Buddhist goods
 IGA (disambiguation)

Japanese-language surnames